is a 1975 Japanese film in Nikkatsu's Roman porno series, directed by Katsuhiko Fujii and starring Naomi Tani and Terumi Azuma.

Synopsis
When the boss of a yakuza clan in 1920s Osaka is assassinated, Oryu, his mistress, vows revenge. Her search for the killer takes her out of the city. The old boss' son proves a poor leader, only interested in Omitsu, his high-class girlfriend. Yajima, the second-in-command, is taking advantage of the situation to accumulate power for himself. Oryu is called back to help stabilize the situation. Yajima kidnaps both Oryu and Omitsu, and subjects them to torture and various forms of sexual humiliations. During the S&M sessions, Oryu learns that Yajima was the killer of the old boss.

Cast
 Naomi Tani - Oryū
 Setsuo Mia - Ginjirō Emoto
 Terumi Azuma - Omitsu
 Morio Kazama - Matsuo
 Akira Takahashi - Tatsuya Yajima
 Toshihiko Oda - Kenji 
 Mari Kojima - Momoko
 Tetsusen Nakahira - Saburō
 Keisuke Yukioka - Shigeyoshi Sawai
 Kōji Yashiro - Eizaburō Kawamura
 Mari Yoshikawa - Prostitute
 Yuki Minami - Runaway prostitute

Critical appraisal
Director Katsuhiko Fujii had previously worked with the duo of Naomi Tani and Terumi Azuma in the successful Cruelty: Black Rose Torture (also 1975). In their Japanese Cinema Encyclopedia: The Sex Films, the Weissers compare Oryu's Passion: Bondage Skin to this previous film, writing, that Cruelty: Black Rose Torture "looks like poetry compared to this hodgepodge of impossible coincidences and ridiculous plot tangents." Among the film's many weak points, they particularly complain about the story's poorly realized characters. They judge that Naomi Tani, however, manages to overcome the weak material, writing, "Ms Tani's larger-than-life screen presence is the only reason to watch." Fujii would regain the knack he had demonstrated for the S&M genre in Cruelty: Black Rose Torture, and go on to be regarded as one of Nikkatsu's top S&M directors.

Availability
Oryu's Passion: Bondage Skin was released theatrically in Japan on June 18, 1975. It was released on home video in VHS format on August 16, 1983 and re-released on May 1, 1992 and again on April 18, 1994. On June 2, 2016, Japanese distributor Happinet released the film on Blu-ray.

Bibliography

English

Japanese

Notes

1975 films
1970s Japanese-language films
Nikkatsu films
Nikkatsu Roman Porno
1970s Japanese films